O Teleftaios Horos (Greek: Ο Τελευταίος Χορός; English: The last dance) is the ninth studio album by Greek singer-songwriter and record producer Nikos Karvelas, released by Sony Music Greece in May 1991.

Track listing

External links 
 Official site

1991 albums
Albums produced by Nikos Karvelas
Greek-language albums
Nikos Karvelas albums
Sony Music Greece albums